Santiago Gamboa (born 1965) is a Colombian writer.

Biography
Born in Bogotá, he studied literature at the Javerian University of Bogotá. He moved to Spain, where he remained until 1990 and graduated in Hispanic philology at the University of Alcalá de Henares. He then moved to Paris, where he studied Cuban literature at the Sorbonne.

He made his debut as a novelist with Páginas de vuelta (1995); later he wrote Perder es cuestión de método (1997), which was translated into Italian, French, Greek, Portuguese, Czech, and German. Later he published Vida feliz de un joven llamado Esteban (2000). He is also the author of the travel book Octubre en Pekín (2001).

In 2009, Gamboa published Necropolis, a novel that won that year's La Otra Orilla Literary Prize.  In 2012 the novel was published in English by Europa Editions.

As a journalist, he has been a contributor to the Latin American Service of Radio France International in Paris, a correspondent for El Tiempo and columnist for the magazine Cromos. He lives in Italy.

Works
 1995 Páginas de vuelta, novel.
 1997 Perder es cuestión de método, novel.
 2000 Vida feliz de un joven llamado Esteban, novel. 
 2001 Los impostores, novel.
 2002 Octubre en Pekín, travel book.
 2004 El cerco de Bogotá, short stories.
 2005 El síndrome de Ulises, novel.
 2008 Hotel Pekin, novel.
 2009 Necrópolis, novel (translated into English as Necropolis).
 2012 Plegarias nocturnas, novel (translated into English as Night Prayers).
 2014 Una casa en Bogotá, novel.
 2016 Volver al oscuro valle, novel (translated into English as Return to the Dark Valley).
 2022 Colombian Psycho  novel

References

1965 births
People from Bogotá
University of Paris alumni
Colombian male writers
Living people
Colombian expatriates in France